Vimalakīrti (  "stainless, undefiled" +   "fame, glory, reputation") is the central figure in the , which presents him as the ideal Mahayana Buddhist upāsaka ("lay practitioner") and a contemporary of Gautama Buddha (6th to 5th century BCE). There is no mention of him in Buddhist texts until after  (1st century BCE to 2nd century CE) revived Mahayana Buddhism in India. The Mahayana Vimalakirti Sutra also spoke of the city of Vaisali as where the lay Licchavi bodhisattva Vimalakirti was residing.

As a Zen Patriarch

The Vimalakīrti Nirdeśa Sūtra characterizes Vimalakīrti as a wealthy patron of Gautama Buddha.

See also 

 Wang Wei

References

External links

Vimalakīrti portrait at Tricycle: The Buddhist Review

Indian Buddhists
6th-century BC people
Bodhisattvas
Buddhist spiritual teachers